The Council of Dads: My Daughters, My Illness, and the Men Who Could Be Me by Bruce Feiler was written in 2010 and published by William Morrow and Company.

Synopsis

When author Bruce Feiler discovered he had cancer he was worried about his daughters growing up without him by their sides to advise them. He decided to create a "Council of Dads", and wrote a letter which he then read to six of his friends asking them to be father figures to his children.

Reception
Sherryl Connelly writing for the New York Daily News said, "Bruce Feiler's twin daughters, Eden and Tybee, were three when he was diagnosed with a rare form of bone cancer in 2008. Just days afterward, the best-selling Brooklyn author came up with the idea of asking six friends to look out for his daughters should he not survive. Feiler's moving new book, "The Council of Dads", tells their story".

Christine Seib writing for The Times said, "What caused the "tsunami of emotion, horror, fear and sleeplessness" that forced him out of bed that morning was the prospect of leaving the dark-haired toddlers who loved to do a dance that was a mix of ballet, ring-a-roses and the hokey pokey. "I kept coming back to the girls—would they wonder who I was, would they yearn for my voice, my approval, my love?"

Nancy Gibbs writing for Time magazine said, "Bruce Feiler is a writer with diverse interests and an adventurous spirit. His best seller Walking the Bible, about his 10,000-mile trek through the Holy Lands, became a hit PBS series; he wrote a book about his year as a circus clown and one on Abraham—nine books total, but none like his latest, The Council of Dads".

Dennis McCafferty writing for USA Today said, "After author Bruce Feiler was diagnosed with cancer in July 2008, he concluded that he needed to write a letter. Yet, he never put it in the mail. It was written to six of his closest friends, asking them to be there for his then-three-year-old twin daughters, Eden and Tybee, in the event of his passing. Each man represented a different era of Feiler's life and a different aspect of Feiler's personality that he wanted passed on to his girls. In the letter, Feiler asked them to join what he described as 'The Council of Dads' that would live on well after he was gone".

Steve Myall writing in The Daily Mirror said, "Dying young and leaving your children to grow up without your love and guidance is a nightmare most parents dare not even contemplate. But that was the chilling prospect facing devoted 45-year-old father of two Bruce Feiler when he was told a seven-inch cancerous tumor was growing in his thigh. At the time his twin daughters Eden and Tybee were just three years old and the terror of facing his own death was overshadowed by his fears for his girls' futures".

Bella DePaulo writing in Psychology Today said, "Have you heard of "The Council of Dads"? It is a concept, a set of friends, and the title of a new book by Bruce Feiler. The author, at age 43, was diagnosed with a rare and potentially deadly form of cancer. Wracked with worry that his twin daughters, then three years old, might grow up without him, Feiler decided to assemble what he called a council of dads for his girls. The council was actually a group of six of his friends, who would go on to become his daughters' friends as well".

Adaptations

Fox TV pilot
In 2011, Fox picked up a single camera, half-hour comedy Council of Dads pilot from Peter Tolan and Sony Pictures Television. It was directed by Anthony and Joe Russo and starred Diane Farr, Ken Howard, Rick Gomez, Patrick Breen, Kyle Bornheimer, and Richard T. Jones. The pilot was not ordered to series.

NBC TV series

In October 2018, NBC announced that Joan Rater and Tony Phelan were developing a new Council of Dads series inspired by the book. This story is about Scott, a loving father of four, has his entire life's plan thrown into upheaval by a cancer diagnosis, he calls on a few of his closest allies to step in as back-up dads for every stage of his growing family's life. Scott assembles a trusted group of role models that includes Anthony, his oldest friend; Larry, his AA sponsor; and Oliver, his surgeon and best friend to his wife, Robin. These men agree to devote themselves to supporting and guiding Scott's amazing family through all the triumphs and challenges life has to offer – just in case he ever can’t be there to do so himself. Sarah Wayne Callies was cast as Robin and Clive Standen as Anthony Lavelle. The series premiered on March 24, 2020.

References

External links
The Council Of Dads
An excerpt from the book

2010 non-fiction books
Literature about cancer
Non-fiction books adapted into television shows